The 2002 European Promotion Cup for Cadettes was the second edition of the basketball European Promotion Cup for cadettes, today known as FIBA U16 Women's European Championship Division C. It was played in Ta' Qali, Malta, from 2 to 6 July 2002. Luxembourg women's national under-16 basketball team won the tournament.

Participating teams

Final standings

References

2002
2002–03 in European women's basketball
FIBA U16
International basketball competitions hosted by Malta
FIBA